Wesley Smith may refer to:

 Wesley J. Smith (born 1949), American lawyer and author
 Wesley O. Smith (1878–1951), American newspaper publisher and businessman
Wesley Smith (academic), physics professor at University of Wisconsin–Madison

See also
 Wes Smith (disambiguation)